The High Commissioner of the United Kingdom to Samoa is the United Kingdom's foremost diplomatic representative to the Independent State of Samoa, and in charge of the UK's diplomatic mission in Samoa.

As Samoa and the United Kingdom are fellow members of the Commonwealth of Nations, diplomatic relations between them are at government level rather than between Heads of State. Thus, the countries exchange High Commissioners rather than ambassadors.

History
The British Government opened its High Commission in Apia in 2019. Previously British interests in Samoa were represented by the British High Commissioner to New Zealand who was also accredited as High Commissioner to Samoa.

List of heads of mission

High Commissioners to Samoa
2006–2010: George Fergusson (non-resident)
2010–2014: Victoria Treadell (non-resident)
2014–2017: Jonathan Sinclair (non-resident)
2018–2019: Laura Clarke (non-resident)

2019–present: David Ward

References

Samoa
United Kingdom
United Kingdom
Samoa and the Commonwealth of Nations
United Kingdom and the Commonwealth of Nations